Comenda is a civil parish in the municipality of Gavião, Portugal. The population in 2011 was 890, in an area of 90.02 km2.

References

Freguesias of Gavião, Portugal